Manuel Rödl (born 23 September 1982) is an Austrian footballer who currently plays for the SV Bürmoos.

External links

 
 fanreport.com profile 
 daten.sportnet.at profile 
 blauweiss-linz.at profile 
 bundesliga.at profile 

1982 births
Living people
Austrian footballers
FC Red Bull Salzburg players
SC Untersiebenbrunn players
FC Lustenau players
SKN St. Pölten players
TSV Neumarkt players
Association football defenders